Sphodroschema is a genus of beetles in the family Carabidae, containing the following species:

 Sphodroschema bayoni Alluaud, 1930
 Sphodroschema crampeli Alluaud, 1930

References

Licininae